Macrobrochis fukiensis is a moth of the family Erebidae. It was described by Franz Daniel in 1952. It is found in Fujian, China.

References

Lithosiina
Moths described in 1952